Ranajit Pande was Nepalese politician, military personnel and courtier in the Kingdom of Nepal. He was member of the Gora Pande clan of Gorkha. He became Mulkaji of Nepal for a brief period in 1804 A.D.

Family

He was born as the second son of Tularam Pande on 1809 Vikram Samvat (1752 A.D.). His ancestors as per the inscription installed by his brother Kapardar Bhotu Pande shows Tularam, Baliram and Birudatta in the three generations.

Relation with Thapas 

He had a daughter Rana Kumari Pande who was married to Thapa Kaji Nain Singh Thapa. Their children were Mathabarsingh Thapa, Ganesh Kumari (mother of Jang Bahadur Rana, Queen Tripurasundari of Nepal and Colonel Ujir Singh Thapa.

Ganesh Kumari is mother of Jung Bahadur Rana, founder of Rana dynasty.

Career

Sino Nepalese war 
He also fought in the Sino-Nepalese War as subordinate commander under Chautariya Kaji Krishna Shah.

As a Mulkaji of Nepal
After the execution of Mulkazi Prime Minister Damodar Pande, Ranajit who happens to be paternal cousin of Damodar was established as Mulkaji (Chief Kazi) along with Bhimsen Thapa as second Kazi, Sher Bahadur Shah as Mul Chautariya and Ranganath Paudel as Raj Guru (Royal Preceptor). Though he was made Mulkazi but the apex power of executive functions of state was carried out by Rana Bahadur Shah who assumed the title of Mukhtiyar (Chief Authority).

References

Bibliography 

Mulkajis
Year of birth missing
Year of death missing